Alfie Richard James Ogborne (born 15 July 2003) is an English cricketer. He made his List A debut on 10 August 2022, for Somerset in the 2022 Royal London One-Day Cup.

References

External links
 

2003 births
Living people
English cricketers
Somerset cricketers
People from Yeovil
Dorset cricketers